was a town located in Hiraka District, Akita Prefecture, Japan.

In 2003, the town has an estimated population of 7,757 and a density of 75.88 persons per km2. The total area was 102.23 km2.

On October 1, 2005, Ōmori, along with the towns of Hiraka, Jūmonji, Masuda and Omonogawa; and the villages of Sannai and Taiyū (all from Hiraka District), was merged into the expanded city of Yokote.

External links
 Yokote official website 

Dissolved municipalities of Akita Prefecture
Yokote, Akita